Ge with middle hook (Ҕ ҕ; italics: Ҕ ҕ) is a letter of the Cyrillic script used in the Yukaghir and Yakut languages  to represent the voiced velar fricative . In Unicode, this letter is called "Ghe with middle hook". The letter was invented in 1844 by Andreas Johan Sjögren for the Ossetian language from the contraction of Cyrillic Г and Gothic .

Usage

Computing codes

See also
Г г : Cyrillic letter Ge
Ғ ғ : Cyrillic letter Ghayn
Ӷ ӷ : Cyrillic letter Ge with descender

References

Cyrillic letters with diacritics
Letters with hook